Dulai is a village in Vidisha district of Madhya Pradesh, India.

References

Villages in Vidisha district